Federalist No. 36 is an essay by Alexander Hamilton, the thirty-sixth of The Federalist Papers. It was published in the New York Packet on January 8, 1788, under the pseudonym Publius, the name under which all The Federalist papers were published. This is the last of seven essays by Hamilton on the then-controversial issue of taxation. It is titled "The Same Subject Continued: Concerning the General Power of Taxation".

Summary
Hamilton details the government's need for a body of tax collectors knowledgeable of every district, so as to establish a value to be taxed. He claims that this will be accomplished by using the same tax collectors as the state governments do. Hamilton argues against a poll tax.

References

External links 

 Text of The Federalist No. 36: congress.gov

36
1788 in American law
1788 essays
1788 in the United States